Barry Donegan (born 5 May 1938) is a former Australian rules footballer who played for the Collingwood Football Club in the Victorian Football League (VFL).

Notes

External links 

1938 births
Australian rules footballers from Victoria (Australia)
Place of birth missing (living people)
Collingwood Football Club players
Living people